The genetic fallacy (also known as the fallacy of origins or fallacy of virtue) is a fallacy of irrelevance in which arguments or information are dismissed or validated based solely on their source of origin rather than their content. In other words, a claim is ignored or given credibility based on its source rather than the claim itself.

The fallacy therefore fails to assess the claim on its merit. The first criterion of a good argument is that the premises must have bearing on the truth or falsity of the claim in question. Genetic accounts of an issue may be true, and they may help illuminate the reasons why the issue has assumed its present form, but they are not conclusive in determining its merits.

In The Oxford Companion to Philosophy (1995) it is asserted that the term originated in Morris Raphael Cohen and Ernest Nagel's book Logic and Scientific Method (1934).  However, in a book review published in The Nation in 1926, Mortimer J. Adler complained that The Story of Philosophy by Will Durant was guilty throughout of "the fallacy of genetic interpretation."  Adler characterized the genetic fallacy generally as "the substitution of psychology for logic."

Examples

From Attacking Faulty Reasoning by T. Edward Damer, Third Edition  36:

There are numerous motives explaining why people choose to wear wedding rings, but it would be a fallacy to presume those who continue the tradition are promoting sexism.

Another example would be from How to Win Every Argument: The Use and Abuse of Logic (2006) by Madsen Pirie, p. 82:

As the author points out, private developers may well have legitimate and knowledgeable opinions on such a matter.

See also

 
 
 
 Appeal to noveltyThe argument that a newer idea is superior
 Chronological snobberyThe argument that an older idea is inferior
 The argument that an older idea is superior 
 
 
 
 Etymological fallacyA fallacy of assuming that the historical meaning of the word is the base of its true meaning
 "Not invented here"A dismissal of "foreign" ideas because they did not originate from the speaker's country, social group, or organization

Notes

External links
Forms of the genetic fallacy
Fallacy files: Genetic fallacy

 
Relevance fallacies